Al Khiyoot (الخيوط ) is a village of Basrah Governorate in southern Iraq.
The village is at 31.0373388n, 47.42882e. on the west bank of the Tigris River north of Al Qurnah.

References

Qurnah